Laureano Antonio "Toni" Villa Suárez (born 7 January 1995), known as Toni Villa or simply Toni, is a Spanish professional footballer who plays for Girona FC as a left winger.

Club career
Born in Murcia, Toni represented Real Valladolid as a youth. He made his senior debut with the reserves on 23 April 2014, coming on as a half-time substitute in a 5–1 Tercera División home routing of Racing Lermeño CF.

Toni scored his first senior goal on 28 September 2014, netting the winner in a 4–3 home success over Real Oviedo in the Segunda División B. On 8 June 2016 he extended his contract until 2018, but was transferred to fellow third-tier club Cultural y Deportiva Leonesa on 4 August.

On 12 June 2017, after helping Cultural in their promotion to the Segunda División after 42 years, Toni returned to Valladolid, with the club activating his buy-back clause, and was definitively assigned to the main squad also in the second division. He made his professional debut on 3 September, replacing Míchel in a 2–0 home win against CD Tenerife.

On 4 December 2017, Toni renewed his contract until 2021. He scored his first professional goal the following 12 May in a 3–2 home defeat of Albacete Balompié, and contributed with 30 league appearances as his side achieved promotion to La Liga.

Toni made his debut in the main category of Spanish football on 17 August 2018, starting in a 0–0 away draw against Girona FC. His first goal in the division came on 1 December, but in a 4–2 home loss against CD Leganés.

On 1 September 2022, Toni signed a three-year contract with Girona FC also in the top tier.

References

External links

Profile at the Girona FC website

1995 births
Living people
Footballers from Murcia
Spanish footballers
Association football wingers
La Liga players
Segunda División players
Segunda División B players
Tercera División players
Real Valladolid Promesas players
Cultural Leonesa footballers
Real Valladolid players
Girona FC players